Nicolas Nemiri (born 3 January 1975, in Mulhouse, France) is a French comic book artist.

Early life and career
As a child, Nemiri had a great passion for books and admiration for French "bande-dessinée" artists such as Jean Giraud / Moebius, Hugo Pratt and André Franquin. He attended the Beaux Art d'Angoulême art school for three years, during which he met and befriended Dominique Bertail and Marc Rigoux. At the age of 20, after living on small jobs and a few illustrations done for Japanese fashion magazines, Nemiri's mother sent some sketches to Éditions Glénat in 1998. Author Jean-David Morvan offered Nemiri his first job and the two have since then worked on numerous collaborations, notably "Je suis morte" and "Hyper l'hyppo" (2005).

Bibliography
"Je suis morte" (storyline: Jean-David Morvan)
Apprendre (2003)
"Hyper l'hippo" (2005) (storyline: Jean-David Morvan)
"Spirou"
n°3429, "L’invasion des jouets trop sympa" (storyline: Jean-David Morvan), 2003
MANDALA"
n°1, "KRAA"
Illustrations du film "Un soupçon d'innocence"

References

External links
Biography in French
Nemirishop.blogspot.com

1975 births
French comics artists
Living people
Artists from Mulhouse